Kristian Johansen (11 March 1916 – 14 March 1975) was a Norwegian athlete. He competed in the men's discus throw at the 1952 Summer Olympics.

References

External links
 

1916 births
1975 deaths
Athletes (track and field) at the 1952 Summer Olympics
Norwegian male discus throwers
Olympic athletes of Norway
Athletes from Oslo